Abdel Hani Kenzi (born 27 September 1973) is a boxer from Algeria.

Career
Kenzi participated in the 2004 Summer Olympics for his native North African country. There, he was stopped in the second round of the Light heavyweight (81 kg) division by Uzbekistan's eventual bronze medalist, Utkirbek Haydarov. He had formerly competed in the 2000 Summer Olympics.

Kenzi qualified for the Athens Games by winning the gold medal at the 1st AIBA African 2004 Olympic Qualifying Tournament in Casablanca, Morocco. In the final of the event, he defeated the Cape Verdian fighter, Flavio Furtado.

Kenzi won the bronze medal in the same division one year earlier, at the All-Africa Games in Abuja, Nigeria.

References

1973 births
Living people
Light-heavyweight boxers
Boxers at the 2000 Summer Olympics
Boxers at the 2004 Summer Olympics
Olympic boxers of Algeria
Algerian male boxers
African Games bronze medalists for Algeria
African Games medalists in boxing
Competitors at the 2003 All-Africa Games
21st-century Algerian people
20th-century Algerian people